Lina Santiago (born September 5, 1978) is an American singer and musician. She is best known for her 1996 single, "Feels So Good (Show Me Your Love)", which peaked at #35 on the Billboard Hot 100 that year.  On the US dance chart, the single peaked at #6 and spent a total of 13 weeks on the chart.

She released one album, Feels So Good, in 1996, which included the single of the same name.

Career
In the early 1990s, Santiago performed with her father's band. In 1995, she formed a singing group with childhood friends and they performed in clubs in Los Angeles, CA. That same year, Santiago won a karaoke contest at the Acapulco restaurant in Downey, CA. This win influenced her decision to pursue a solo career in music.

Later that year, she met with Juan Lopez, better known as DJ Juanito, a popular DJ in Los Angeles, and owner of Groove Nation Records. Juanito produced and recorded Santiago's first single, "Feels So Good (Show Me Your Love)", which was completed in less than five hours. The song quickly took off, reaching #1 in Los Angeles and Santiago signed an album deal with Universal Records.

Her debut album Feels So Good was released on August 27, 1996 when she was just 17 years old. Universal Records had most of the creative control on the album and insisted that Santiago record pop ballads, a sound that was very different from her first single. This decision proved to be bad, as album sales were lackluster and her follow-up single, "Just Because I Love You," did poorly on the charts, just reaching #78 on the Billboard Hot 100 and #27 on Billboard's Rhythmic Top 40 chart.

In 1997, a re-recorded version of the song "Cutie Pie" (without Latin Hip Hop group Delinquent Habits) was scheduled for a January release but plans were scrapped. Santiago was later dropped by Universal Records and never released a follow-up album. In 2007, she provided vocals to two tracks by Monteloco: "Hot Mami" and "Girlz Nite Out".

Currently in 2017 she teamed up with Randy Taylor-Weber (creator of "In a Dream" by Rockell) and Lenny Ruckus 
to form a brand new song entitled "Mi Amor" to rave reviews

Discography

Solo albums
1996: Feels So Good

Singles
2017: "Mi Amor" featured with Randy Taylor-Weber & Lenny Ruckus 
1996: "Feels So Good (Show Me Your Love)" – U.S. #35
1996: "Just Because I Love You" – U.S. #78
1996: "Dale Que Dale"

References

1978 births
Living people
American dance musicians
American freestyle musicians
20th-century American singers
20th-century American women singers
21st-century American singers
21st-century American women singers